Stripe rust may refer to:

 Barley stripe rust
 Wheat stripe rust